Clarke Flynn (born 7 August 1959) is a Canadian bobsledder. He competed in the four man event at the 1984 Winter Olympics.

References

1959 births
Living people
Canadian male bobsledders
Olympic bobsledders of Canada
Bobsledders at the 1984 Winter Olympics
People from Jever